A neck frill is the relatively extensive margin seen on the back of the heads of reptiles with either a bony support such as those present on the skulls of dinosaurs of the suborder Marginocephalia or a cartilaginous one as in the frill-necked lizard. 

In technical terms, the bone-supported frill is composed of an enlarged parietal bone flanked by elongated squamosals and sometimes ringed by epoccipitals, bony knobs that gave the margin a jagged appearance. In the early 1900s, the parietal bone was known among paleontologists as the dermosupraoccipital. The feature is now referred to as the parietosquamosal frill. In some genera, such as Triceratops, Pentaceratops, Centrosaurus and Torosaurus, this extension is very large. Despite the neck frill predominantly being made of hard bone, some neck frills are made of skin, as is the case with the frill-necked lizard of today that resides in Australia. The use of the neck frill in dinosaurs is uncertain; it may have been used for thermoregulation or simply as a defense mechanism. Indeed, during battles for territory, competing Triceratops crashed heads together with their elongated horns and the neck frill may have been employed as a kind of shield, protecting the rest of the animal from harm. However, usage of the neck frill in modern reptiles is better documented. Two chief and disparate examples are the horned lizards (genus Phrynosoma) with a bony frill, and the frill-necked lizard (genus Chlamydosaurus) with a cartilaginous frill. The frill-necked lizard's frill is mainly made up of flaps of skin, which are usually coloured pink, supported by cartilaginous spines. Similar to the portrayal of the dinosaur Dilophosaurus in Steven Spielberg's  Jurassic Park, and in Colin Trevorrow's Jurassic World Dominion,
frill-necked lizard puff out these neck frills on either side of its head when threatened. The lizards often raise their frills when battling for territory or when coming into contact with another lizard, especially during mating season. There is, however, no evidence that suggests that Dilophosaurus had the same abilities, as many of its features in the Jurassic Park film were mostly fictional.

Numerous other animals of both modern and prehistoric times use both skin or bone protrusions to make themselves seem more threatening, attract mates or to thermoregulate. Examples of these are the usage of dewlaps and crests in lizards, dinosaurs and birds. The unusual red-fan parrot has a feathery neck frill which is used for display purposes.

See also

Armour (zoology)
Crest
Dewlap

References

Weldon Owen Pty Ltd. (1993). Encyclopedia of animals - Mammals, Birds, Reptiles, Amphibians. Reader's Digest Association, Inc. .

Reptile anatomy
Dinosaur anatomy